Lars Anders Cardinal Arborelius  (born 24 September 1949) is a Swedish Catholic cardinal. He has been Bishop of Stockholm since 1998. Pope Francis made him a cardinal, the first ever from Sweden and Scandinavia, on 28 June 2017.

Early life and ordination
Arborelius was born on 24 September 1949 in Sorengo, Switzerland, to Swedish parents, and grew up in Lund in Scania. He was raised as a Lutheran and always showed a lot of interest in the contemplative life, saying, "I always had this longing for a life of prayer and silent adoration." After a year-and-a-half-long process, he observed, "Truth has been given to me through the Catholic faith,” and converted to Catholicism at the age of 20. 

At first, following his conversion, he desired to be a diocesan priest, but, after reading Saint Thérèse of Lisieux's autobiography (The Story of a Soul), he wanted to be a member of the Discalced Carmelites. In 1971, two years after he became Catholic, he entered the Carmelite order at the Norraby monastery located near the town of Rydebäck in Southern Sweden. In 1977, Arborelius took his perpetual vows in Bruges, Belgium, where he then obtained his degree in philosophy and theology. He also studied modern languages at Lund University. After obtaining his doctoral degree at the Pontifical Theological Faculty Teresianum in Rome, he was ordained as a priest in Malmö on 8 September 1979.

Bishop
On 17 November 1998, Pope John Paul II appointed Arborelius Bishop of Stockholm, and he was consecrated on 29 December 1998 by Bishop Hubert Brandenburg. When he succeeded Brandenburg as the Bishop of Stockholm—the only Catholic diocese in Sweden, comprising the entire country—he became the first ethnic Swede and only the second Scandinavian Catholic bishop since the Protestant Reformation. Most Catholics in Sweden since the Reformation, particularly among the clergy, have been immigrants or of immigrant descent from all over Europe (but especially Eastern Europe) and from the Middle East, as well as Arabs and Armenians of various Catholic rites. Additionally, there are converts from various backgrounds, including some Protestant ministers, who have become part of the Catholic community in his diocese.

Arborelius took part in The Indian Priest (2015), a documentary film about Indian missionary priest Raphael Curian.

Cardinal 
On 21 May 2017, Pope Francis announced he would make Arborelius a cardinal, the first Swedish national ever to hold the position; including during Sweden’s 500-year Catholic history before the Swedish reformation. Arborelius became a cardinal on 28 June 2017. He said he thought Francis was recognizing Sweden's role in accepting immigrants and promoting interdenominational dialogue.

Swedish news magazine Fokus named him "Swede of the Year" for 2017. It said that he had been "part of Swedish public debate" since 1998, that he brought "a fearless attitude" to his role in "secular and otherwise Lutheran" society, and "plays an essential role in bringing native Swedes and immigrant Swedes together".

Francis made him a member of the Pontifical Council for Promoting Christian Unity on 23 December 2017. Pope Francis named him a member of the Congregation for the Oriental Churches on 6 August 2019. On 13 July 2022, Pope Francis named him a member of the Dicastery for Bishops.

References

External links

 
 Anders Arborelius at Catholic-Hierarchy.org.
 Presentation of Anders Arborelius at the website of the Catholic diocese of Stockholm 
 "Our Bishop", a page of letters from Arborelius at the website of the Catholic diocese of Stockholm (in Swedish)
 

|-

|-

|-

1949 births
Living people
People from Sorengo
Teresianum alumni
Roman Catholic bishops of Stockholm
Discalced Carmelite bishops
Converts to Roman Catholicism from Lutheranism
Discalced Carmelites
Swedish expatriates in Switzerland
20th-century Roman Catholic bishops in Sweden
Cardinals created by Pope Francis
Swedish cardinals
Carmelite cardinals
Members of the Order of the Holy Sepulchre